Bartkowice  is a village in the administrative district of Gmina Kłomnice, within Częstochowa County, Silesian Voivodeship, in southern Poland.

The village has a population of 305.

References

Bartkowice